Ana-Maria Avram (1961–2017) was a Romanian composer, pianist, conductor and musicologist.

Biography 
Avram was born in 1961 in Bucharest, Romania. She attended the National University of Music Bucharest from 1980 to 1985, after which she studied aesthetics at Sorbonne, Paris. She was also the co-director of Hyperion Ensemble with her husband Iancu Dumitrescu, who founded the ensemble in 1976. Avram also took on an administrative role by creating Spectrum XXI festival and was an early member of the Romanian Community of electronic and computer music. She continues to have performances of her works after her death, like Issue Projects Room's "Tombeau for Ana-Maria Avram" concert.

Avram died in 2017.

Musical style 

Avram's music synthesized contemporary classical, improvisation, electro-acoustic- and electronic music. Her music tended to move between improvisation and notation and often used electronics to augment her sonic palette. Avram was a proponent of spectral music, and argued that spectralism is "a specific attitude towards sound" which encompasses "many different viewpoints".

References 

1961 births
2017 deaths
Women classical composers
Musicians from Bucharest
Romanian classical composers
Spectral music
Women in electronic music
21st-century classical composers
21st-century women composers